and  are feminine Japanese given names.

Possible writings
Yuka and Yūka can be written using different kanji characters and can mean:

由香, "reason, fragrance"
由華, "reason, beautiful"
由佳, "reason, good"
由花, "reason, flower"
有佳, "exist, good"
有香, "exist, fragrance"
有華, "exist, beautiful"
優花, "tenderness, flower"
優香, "tenderness, fragrance"
結花, "link, flower"
The name can also be written in hiragana or katakana.

People
pronounced Yuka
Yuka (有香), a Japanese singer
, a Japanese long-distance runner
, a Japanese rhythmic gymnast
, a Japanese snowboarder
, a Japanese ice hockey player
Yuka Hirata (裕香), a Japanese actress and gravure idol
Yuka Honda (ゆか), a Japanese musician
Yuka Hoshaku (有香), a Japanese actress
Yuka Iguchi (井口 裕香, born 1988), a Japanese voice actress 
Yuka Imai (由香, born 1970), a Japanese voice actress 
Yuka Inokuchi (有佳), a Japanese voice actress
, a Japanese table tennis player
Yuka Itaya (由夏), a Japanese actress and newscaster
, a Japanese speed skater
Yuka Kashino (有香), a Japanese singer and a member of Perfume
, a Japanese swimmer
Yuka Komatsu (born 1978) a Japanese voice actress
Yuka Kosaka (由佳), a Japanese gravure idol, actress and model
, a Japanese gravure idol, television personality and actress
, a Japanese racewalker
Yuka Motohashi (由香), a Japanese actress
Yuka Murayama (由佳), a modern Japanese writer
, a Japanese goalball player
, a Japanese ice hockey player
Yuka Onishi (結花), a Japanese actress and singer
Yuka Orihara (born 2000), a Finnish ice dancer
, a Japanese ten-pin bowler
Yuka Sato (有香), a Japanese figure skater
Yuka Saitō (essayist) (由香), a Japanese essayist and Suntory employee
Yuka Saitō (voice actress) (佑圭), a Japanese voice actress
Yuka Terasaki (寺崎 裕香), a Japanese voice actress
Yuka Tokumitsu (born 1969), a Japanese voice actress
Yuka Tsujiyoko (由佳), a Japanese video game music composer for Nintendo
, a Japanese sailor

pronounced Yūka
Yūka (優香), a Japanese actress
, a member of Hinatazaka46
, a Japanese YouTuber
Yuuka Maeda (憂佳), an ex-member of the Hello! Project group S/mileage
, a Japanese women's footballer
Yuuka Nanri (侑香), a Japanese voice actress and J-Pop singer
Yuka Nomura (佑香), a Japanese actress
, a Japanese politician
Yuka Saso (笹生 優花), a Japanese professional golfer
Yūka Setō (勢藤 優花), a Japanese ski jumper
, an ex-member of Sakurazaka46
Yūka Tano (優花), an ex-member of AKB48

Fictional characters
pronounced Yuka
 Yuka Koizumi, a character from Guru Guru Pon-chan
 Yuka Nakagawa, a character from the Battle Royale novel, films and manga from the same name
 Yuka Takeuchi, a character from the Variable Geo fighting game series
 Yuka, one of Kagome's schoolmates from InuYasha
 Yuka, a character from Elfen Lied
 Yuka Sanada, a character from Genseishin Justirisers
 Yuka Mochida, a character from Corpse Party
 Yuka Kon, a character from World Trigger
 Yuka Osada, a character from Kamen Rider 555
 Yuka Ohta, a character from Ultraman Z

pronounced Yūka
Yūka Kazami, a character from the Touhou Project danmaku game series
Yūka Ichijō, a character from AKB0048

References

Japanese feminine given names